Entomological Society may refer to:

 Acadian Entomological Society
 Amateur Entomologists' Society
 Australian Entomological Society
 Czech Entomological Society
 Egyptian Entomological Society
 Entomological Society of America
 Entomological Society of Canada
 Entomological Society of China
 Entomoligical Society of Iran
 Entomological Society of Israel
 Entomological Society of Japan
 Entomological Society of Malta
 Entomological Society of New South Wales
 Entomological Society of New Zealand 
 Entomological Society of Queensland
 Entomological Society of Sweden
 Entomological Society of Victoria
 Entomological Society of Washington
 Flemish Entomological Society
 Florida Entomological Society
 Lancashire and Cheshire Entomological Society
 Maine Entomological Society
 Netherlands Entomological Society
 New England Entomological Society
 New York Entomological Society
 North Carolina Entomological Society
 Norwegian Entomological Society
 Polish Entomological Society
 Royal Belgian Entomological Society
 Royal Entomological Society of London
 Société Entomologique de France
 Texas Entomological Society
 Ukrainian Entomological Society